Catachlorops is a genus of horse flies in the family Tabanidae.

Species
Catachlorops alcis (Williston, 1896)
Catachlorops alphus Wilkerson, 1979
Catachlorops amazonicus Loureiro Henriques & Gorayeb, 1999
Catachlorops auripilis (Philip, 1960)
Catachlorops bahianus Fairchild, 1940
Catachlorops balachowskyi Fairchild, 1970
Catachlorops balioptera Gorayeb, 1991
Catachlorops beameri (Philip, 1958)
Catachlorops bicolor (Kröber, 1931)
Catachlorops bindai Rafael, Gorayeb & Rosa, 1992
Catachlorops bogotanus (Enderlein, 1922)
Catachlorops borgmeieri Lane, 1936
Catachlorops capreolus (Wiedemann, 1828)
Catachlorops carrerai Barretto, 1946
Catachlorops circumfusus (Wiedemann, 1830)
Catachlorops conspicuus (Lutz & Neiva, 1914)
Catachlorops dalmeidai Pechuman, 1946
Catachlorops difficilis (Kröber, 1931)
Catachlorops ecuadoriensis (Enderlein, 1925)
Catachlorops ferrugineus (Barretto, 1948)
Catachlorops flavus (Wiedemann, 1828)
Catachlorops fonsecai Barretto, 1946
Catachlorops fortunensis Fairchild, 1986
Catachlorops fulmineus (Hine, 1920)
Catachlorops fumipennis Kröber, 1931
Catachlorops furcatus (Wiedemann, 1828)
Catachlorops fuscinervis (Macquart, 1838)
Catachlorops fuscivittatus (Barretto, 1948)
Catachlorops halteratus Kröber, 1931
Catachlorops immaculatus (Macquart, 1838)
Catachlorops lanei Barretto, 1946
Catachlorops leptogaster Barretto, 1946
Catachlorops lineatus Burger, 1999
Catachlorops luctuosus (Macquart, 1838)
Catachlorops maculatus Burger, 1999
Catachlorops medemi Philip, 1970
Catachlorops mellosus Loureiro Henriques & Gorayeb, 1999
Catachlorops muscosus (Enderlein, 1922)
Catachlorops nebulosus Kröber, 1931
Catachlorops niger (Kröber, 1931)
Catachlorops nigripalpis (Macquart, 1846)
Catachlorops nigriventer Barretto, 1946
Catachlorops overali Fairchild & Rafael, 1985
Catachlorops pechumani (Barretto, 1948)
Catachlorops phaeopterus (Barretto, 1948)
Catachlorops plagiatus (Brèthes, 1910)
Catachlorops potator (Wiedemann, 1828)
Catachlorops praetereuns (Walker, 1850)
Catachlorops psolopterus (Wiedemann, 1828)
Catachlorops quadrimaculatus (Macquart, 1846)
Catachlorops rubiginosus (Summers, 1911)
Catachlorops rufescens (Fabricius, 1805)
Catachlorops rufipennis (Macquart, 1838)
Catachlorops rufithorax (Walker, 1848)
Catachlorops scurrus (Fairchild, 1958)
Catachlorops scutellatus (Macquart, 1838)
Catachlorops siculus Wilkerson, 1979
Catachlorops striatus Burger, 1999
Catachlorops testaceus (Macquart, 1846)
Catachlorops therioplectiformis Kröber, 1931
Catachlorops umbratus (Hine, 1920)
Catachlorops unicolor (Lutz, 1912)
Catachlorops vespertinus (Bequaert & Renjifo-Salcedo, 1946)
Catachlorops victoria (Fairchild, 1940)
Catachlorops zikani Barretto, 1946

References

Tabanidae
Brachycera genera
Diptera of South America
Diptera of North America
Taxa named by Adolfo Lutz